Countess Elisabeth Dobrženský of Dobrženitz (also Dobrzensky of Dobrzenicz or Dobřenský of Dobřenice; ; 7 December 1875 – 11 June 1951) was a Bohemian noblewoman whose marriage to the son of the former heiress to the throne of Brazil prompted renunciation of his claim to the abolished monarchy's throne.

Early life 
She was the daughter of Johann Wenzel, Count Dobrzensky of Dobrzenicz (1841–1919) and his wife, Countess Elisabeth Kottulinsky, Baroness of Kottulin and Krzizkowitz (1850–1929).

She had three elder brothers Jan, Otokar and Jaroslav and a younger brother named Karl Kunata. Karl Kunata renamed himself to Count Kottulinský in Austria in 1905; late in 1912, he married Countess Maria Theresia von Meran, member of a morganatic branch of the House of Habsburg-Lorraine.

Legacy 
Elisabeth married Pedro de Alcântara, Prince of Grão-Pará on 14 November 1908 at Versailles. He had previously renounced his hereditary claim to the crown of Brazil because she was not of royal birth. They had five children:

 Princess Isabelle of Orléans-Braganza (1911–2003) married Henri, count of Paris - parents of Henri, Orléanist pretender to the throne of France.
 Prince Pedro Gastão of Orléans-Braganza (1913–2007) married Princess Maria de la Esperanza of Bourbon-Two Sicilies - parents of Princess Maria da Gloria, Duchess of Segorbe, former Crown Princess of Yugoslavia.
 Princess Maria Francisca of Orléans-Braganza (1914–1968) married Duarte Nuno, Duke of Braganza - parents of Duarte Pio, Duke of Braganza, the current pretender to the throne of Portugal.
 Prince João Maria of Orléans-Braganza (1916–2005) married Fatima Sherifa Chirine (1923-1990), widow of Prince Hassan Toussoun, Prince of Egypt.
 Princess Teresa of Orléans-Braganza (1919-2011) married Ernesto António Maria Martorell y Calderó (1921-1985).
 
Elisabeth died on 11 June 1951 at the age of 75. She was buried with Pedro.

Honors 
  :  Dame of the Order of the Starry Cross.

Ancestry

References

External links 
 Article about Elisabeth Dobrzensky published in Royal Digest

1875 births
1951 deaths
People from Chotěboř
19th-century Czech women
20th-century Czech women
20th-century French women
Bohemian nobility
Elisabeth
French people of Czech descent
Brazilian people of Czech descent
French people of Brazilian descent
Burials at the Imperial Mausoleum at the Cathedral of Petrópolis
Dames of the Order of Saint Isabel